7 Days in Syria is a 2015 American documentary film directed and produced by Robert Rippberger. Filmed in November 2012, it captures the human side of war and what life is like in Syria for the millions trying to escape. The film has played in over 50 cities worldwide (including Los Angeles, San Francisco, Washington D.C., New York, Toronto, London, Paris, Dublin, Norrkoping, Amsterdam, and Sydney), on television in Denmark, Sweden, and China, to Angelina Jolie, to senior members of the United Nations, and at Britain's House of Lords. The film was released internationally by Ro*co films, throughout North America by Gunpowder & Sky, by Gathr films for theatrical-on-demand, and online through Hulu.

Synopsis
7 Days in Syria is a portrayal of the human side of war. The film looks out the people of Aleppo, chronicling the civilians keeping the city running, providing bread, administering medical supplies, burying dead bodies, and those internally documenting the atrocities for posterity and war tribunals.

Reception

Critical response

The "Moderate Voice" also gave it 5 stars writing:

DC FilmDom gave it 5 stars and wrote:

References

External links
 
 
 Ro*co Films: 7 Days in Syria

2015 films
2015 documentary films
American documentary films
Aleppo in the Syrian civil war
Documentary films about the Syrian civil war
2010s English-language films
2010s American films